Georgios Yiotas, best known as Gonos Yiotas, was a Slavophone Greek chieftain of the Macedonian Struggle. He is revered as a hero in the Pella region of Greece and ranks among the most notable participants of the struggle. He mainly operated around the Giannitsa Lake and cooperated with other well respected revolutionaries such as Stergios Daoutis, Alexandros Mazarakis, Ioannis Demestichas, and Tellos Agras. He came to be known as the “Ghost of the Lake” (το Στοιχείο της Λίμνης).

Early life 
He was born in the village of Plugar in 1880, a village near Giannitsa. His father, Vasileios Yiotas was from the village of Kadinovo (now Galatades) and had been a member of a local Greek committee. From a young age, he worked with his father and his brother Konstantinos Yiotas (also a future Makedonomachos) in the fields of the Agios Loukas Monastery just off the Lake of Giannitsa. It was there that he learned to operate a firearm as his father was an armed guard.

He was first cousin to Bulgarian IMRO band leader Apostol Petkov, who became known as the "Sun of Yenice-i Vardar."

Early Armed Action 
Gonos Yiotas had been involved with the IMRO in the band of his cousin, Apostol Petkov from 1900 to 1904, with whom he participated in the Ilinden Uprising and experienced several skirmishes against Ottoman troops. However, he and his mother were Greek Patriarchists, which led him to harbour sympathies for the Greek cause. When the IMRO organized the public stoning of the Metropolitan of Vodena, he would come to question his future with the organization. A rift began to form between himself and the IMRO which would further widen following an altercation in the village of Agios Loukas. 

The altercation occurred when three armed Komitadjis had entered the church where Gonos Yiotas was attending Sunday liturgy and demanded that the priest be replaced with one loyal to the Exarchate. Gonos had also been armed, and following a heated exchange, the Komitadjis agreed to leave.

Macedonian Struggle 
With relations soured, Gonos Yiotas deserted the IMRO and joined the Greek side in October 1904, entering the service of the Greek consulate of Thessaloniki in 1905. He was primarily active in the area of Giannitsa. He initially acted as a guide in the marshes of Lake Giannitsa where his diligence built him a reputation. Locals widely attribute his effectiveness to an immunity to mosquito bites. His presence proved irreplaceable due his knowledge of the landscape and local populations, as some Makedonomachoi were native to other parts of Greece. It was with these other Greeks that he learned the Greek language, specifically the Cretan dialect.

Gonos Yiotas was instrumental in returning 6 villages from the Bulgarian Exarchate to the allegiance of the Ecumenical Patriarchate of Constantinople and had encountered several clashes with the band of his cousin, Apostol Petkov. In March 1905, he joined the first well-organized Greek military group. The next year, he cooperated with Tellos Agras, achieving great successes. From 1908, he began to act with his own military group and at the end of the same year, he was forced to shelter in Athens.

After the Young Turk Revolution 
After the Young Turk Revolution, the Young Turks urged the arm groups of Macedonia to lay down their weapons with promise of major reform and equality and many did, however, Gonos Yiotas did not. He continued to operate around the swamps of Lake Giannitsa, but a friend of former ally Apostolis Matopoulos by the name of Dr. Antonakis collaborated with the new regime and surrendered Gonos' weapons cache in the swamp for personal gain. He issued a complaint about the betrayal to the Greek Ministry of Foreign Affairs but it was to no avail. He took time away from his revolutionary lifestyle and went to Athens but would return to Macedonia in 1909 following a resurge in Bulgarian attacks on Greek villages. In his return to the conflict, his armed band would once again come to blows with that of his first cousin, Apostol Petkov. In November 1909, Gonos recorded 86 kills, 21 in skirmishes and 65 in ambushes.

In 1910, he and fellow chieftains Lazos Dogiamas and Athanasios Betsos grew dissatisfied with the leadership in Athens. They made their dissatisfaction obvious which resulted in the three revolutionaries being classified as robbers and pursued by Greek authorities.

Death 
In 1911, rumours had spread that Gonos Yiotas was angered by the actions of his former ally Apostolis Matopoulos and Dr. Antonakis and their collaboration with the Young Turks. Matopoulos was alarmed and fled the region for his safety. 

Following a betrayal, Gonos Yiotas was killed on 12 February 1911, during an operation of the Ottoman army which resulted in his encirclement at the Lake of Giannitsa. It has been speculated by many that Matopoulos and/or Dr. Antonakis were responsible for the betrayal. Matopoulos would go on to flee to the United States while Dr. Antonakis would be executed for his acts of endangering the Greek cause.

Following his death, the body of Gonos Yiotas was recovered and buried in the cemetery of Giannitsa.

Legacy 
He is honoured as a local hero in the Pella region of Greece.

A street and square bear his name in Giannitsa, the town in which he rests.

There are two identical busts of him, one in Vasileios Romfei Square in Thessaloniki and one in Gonou Yiota Square in Giannitsa

Some of his belongings are on display at the Folklore Museum of Giannitsa.

He is mentioned in the "Secrets of the Swamp" by the renowned Penelope Delta.

His surviving descendants live in Greece and some migrated to the USA.

Other Images

Sources

Footnotes

Bibliography

1880s births
1911 deaths
Eastern Orthodox Christians from Greece
People from Thessaloniki (regional unit)
People from Salonica vilayet
20th-century Greek people
Macedonian revolutionaries (Greek)
Slavic speakers of Greek Macedonia
Greek people of the Macedonian Struggle
Greeks from the Ottoman Empire
Members of the Internal Macedonian Revolutionary Organization